Ave Fénix (the phoenix bird) may refer to:

 Ave Fénix, an album by Daniela Romo, and "Ave Fenix", a song on the album
 Ave Fénix (TV series), a Mexican telenovela
 A film company co-founded by Zachary Laoutides
 Ave Fénix, a 1986 film directed by Rafael Baledón